Polycystic kidney disease 2-like 1 protein also known as transient receptor potential polycystic 2 (TRPP2; formerly TRPP3) is a protein that in humans is encoded by the PKD2L1 gene.

Function 

TRPP2 is a member of the polycystin protein family. TRPP2 contains multiple transmembrane domains, and cytoplasmic N- and C-termini. TRPP2 may be an integral membrane protein involved in cell-cell/matrix interactions. TRPP2 functions as a calcium-regulated nonselective cation channel. Alternative splice variants have been described but their full length sequences have not been determined.

Interactions 

PKD2L1 has been shown to interact with TNNI3.

See also 
 TRPP

References

Further reading